This is a list of countries by population in 1800. Estimate numbers are from the beginning of the year, and exact population figures are for countries that were having a census in the year 1800 (which were on various dates in that year). The bulk of these numbers are sourced from Alexander V. Avakov's Two Thousand Years of Economic Statistics, Volume 1, pages 21 to 24, which cover population figures from the year 1800 divided into modern borders. Avakov, in turn, cites a variety of sources, mostly Angus Maddison. Italian sub figures are derived from elsewhere. Other figures come from Jan Lahmeyer's website, which in turn is based on a variety of sources.

List

Note 
The aggregate populations will exceed the total population because some states existed in multiple entities.  For example, the Kingdom of Prussia and the Habsburg monarchy had holdings that were also part of the Holy Roman Empire (though not all of the Prussian and Habsburg territories shared this aspect). In another case, the province of Wallachia was a vassal of the Ottoman sultan, but also a tributary of the Russian Empire.

See also
List of countries by population
List of countries by population in 1700
List of countries by population in 1900
List of countries by population in 2000
List of countries by population in 2005

Notes

References

Kurt Witthauer. Bevölkerung der Erde (1958)
Calendario atlante de Agostini, anno 99 (2003)
The Columbia gazetteer of the world (1998)
Britannica book of the year : world data (1997)

1800
1800